August Reinisch (born 29 January 1965 in Vienna) is an Austrian public international lawyer.

Biography 
He obtained Master’s degrees in law (1988) and in philosophy (1990) as well as an LL.M. (1989) from NYU Law School and a doctorate in law (1991) from the University of Vienna. He is admitted to the Bars of New York and of Connecticut (since 1990). In 1994, he obtained the Diploma of the Hague Academy of International Law.

He received his venia docendi (right to teach as a professor of international and European law) at the University of Vienna in 1998. At this university, he has been Head of the Section International Law and International Relations since 2005 and Director of the LL.M. Program in International Legal Studies since 2006. From 2004 to 2006 and from 2010 to 2016 he was Dean for International Relations of the Law School of the University of Vienna. Since 2010, he has been professor of international law with a focus on international economic law and the law of international organizations. From 2016 to 2019, he served as a Member of the Academic Senate of the University of Vienna.

August Reinisch has served as arbitrator in investment cases mostly under International Centre for Settlement of Investment Disputes and UNCITRAL Rules, and provided expert opinions in the field. He is a Member of the International Centre for Settlement of Investment Disputes Panels of Conciliators and of Arbitrators and of the Court of the Permanent Court of Arbitration.

Memberships 
 International Law Commission, 
 membre associé of the Institut de droit international, 
 Corresponding member of the Austrian Academy of Sciences, 
 President of the Austrian Branch of the International Law Association
 Former President of the German Society of International Law.

Notable awards 
2021 Austrian Cross of Honour for Science and Art, First Class

Publications (excerpts) 
 US-Exportkontrollrecht in Österreich. (Vienna, Manz-Verlag 1991) (= Vol. 16 Recht-Wirtschaft-Außenhandel, P. Doralt/H. Haschek, eds.), 146 pp. ISBN 3-214-06565-3.
 State responsibility for debts. Debts (Vienna – Cologne – Weimar, Böhlau-Verlag 1995) (= Vol. 5 Europarecht – Internationales Wirtschafts-/Währungsrecht – Völkerrecht, ed. by Waldemar Hummer), 154 pp., ISBN 3-205-98293-2.
 with Gerhard Hafner: Staatensukzession und Schuldenübernahme. Beim "Zerfall" der Sowjetunion. (Vienna, Service Fachverlag 1995) (= vol. 9 FOWI-Schriftenreihe, ed. by Doralt), 168 pp., ISBN 3-85428-320-2.
 International Organizations before National Courts (Cambridge, Cambridge University Press 2000) (= Vol. 10 Cambridge Studies in International and Comparative Law, ed. by James Crawford), 449 pp.
 with Christoph Schreuer, Loretta Malintoppi and Anthony Sinclair: The ICSID Convention: A Commentary (Cambridge, Cambridge University Press, 2nd ed., 2009), 1524 pp.
 Essentials of EU Law (Cambridge, Cambridge University Press, 2nd ed., 2012), 281 pp.
 with Marc Bungenberg: From Bilateral Arbitral Tribunals and Investment Courts to a Multilateral Investment Court. Options Regarding the Institutionalization of Investor-State Dispute Settlement. (Special Issue of European Yearbook of International Economic Law, Springer, 2nd ed., 2020), pp. 222. , ISBN 3-662-59731-4.
 Advanced Introduction to International Investment Law (Cheltenham, UK – Northampton, MA, USA, Edward Elgar Publishing, 2020), pp. 136.
 with Christoph Schreuer: International Protection of Investments. The Substantive Standards (Cambridge, Cambridge University Press 2020), pp. 1098. 
 with Marc Bungenberg: Draft Statute of the Multilateral Investment Court (Studies in International Investment Law Vol. 37, Baden-Baden, Nomos 2021), pp. 80.

References

External links 
 https://eur-int-comp-law.univie.ac.at/en/team/reinisch-august/

1965 births
Living people
20th-century Austrian lawyers
21st-century Austrian lawyers
Members of the International Law Commission